The 2005 Western Carolina Catamounts team represented Western Carolina University as a member of the Southern Conference (SoCon) in the 2005 NCAA Division I-AA football season. The Catamounts were led by fourth-year head coach Kent Briggs and played their home games at Bob Waters Field at E. J. Whitmire Stadium. They finished the season 5–4 and 4–3 in SoCon play to place fourth.

Schedule

References

Western Carolina
Western Carolina Catamounts football seasons
Western Carolina Catamounts football